The Faculty of Medicine and Pharmacy of Rabat (also known as FMP-Rabat) is a Moroccan public higher education in Medicine and Pharmacy established in 1962.  It is affiliated with the University Mohammed V - Souissi Rabat.

History 

The FMP-Rabat was established by Moroccan Dahir 1.58.390. The faculty was officially opened by Hassan II of Morocco on 16 October 1962 and opened in November of the academic year 1962–1963. On 16 October 1986, the "Pharmacy" section was born. The residency was established in March 1996.
In 2013 the faculty has celebrated its 50th anniversary, it has formed more than 13,000 doctors and nearly 2,000 pharmacists.

Deans of faculty 

 Pr Abdelmalek Faraj: 1962–1969
 Pr Abdellatif Berbich: 1969–1974
 Pr Bachir Lazrak: 1974–1981
 Pr Taieb Chkili: 1981–1989
 Pr Mohamed Tahar Alaoui: 1989–1997
 Pr Abdelmajid Belmahi: 1997–2003
 Pr Najia Hajjaj-Hassouni: 2003–2013
 Pr Mohamed Adnaoui: 2013–current

Buildings 

The FMPR has 7 amphitheatres with a capacity of 2800, 03 meeting rooms with a capacity of 216, 12 Classrooms and tutorials  with a capacity 678,29 practical works rooms with a capacity of 1245

It has also 17 clinical laboratories and preclinical basic sciences, 109 hospital services distributed by specialty in all hospital units depending on the Ibn Sina University Hospital of Rabat-Salé

References

External links 
 

Translated pages